The Guttenberg Corn Canning Co. is a historic building located in Guttenberg, Iowa, United States.  The facility was built by Waukon, Iowa contractor Nelson Beeler, and completed in 1912 for the Guttenberg Corn Canning Company.  It is considered a good example of a three-story brick commercial structure.  After World War II the building was occupied by Iowa Food Products, and now by Kann Manufacturing Company.  The building was listed on the National Register of Historic Places in 1984.

References

Industrial buildings completed in 1912
Guttenberg, Iowa
Buildings and structures in Clayton County, Iowa
National Register of Historic Places in Clayton County, Iowa
Industrial buildings and structures on the National Register of Historic Places in Iowa